Bourma may refer to:

 Bourma, Boulgou, Burkina Faso
 Bourma, Ganzourgou, Burkina Faso
 A variation of baklava